Daniel McConnell may refer to:

 Daniel McConnell (footballer) (born 1986), Australian rules footballer
 Daniel McConnell (cyclist) (born 1985), Australian cross-country mountain biker